Abraham Fischer (9 April 1850 – 16 November 1913) was a South African statesman. He was the sole Prime Minister of the Orange River Colony in South Africa, and when that ceased to exist joined the cabinet of the newly formed Union of South Africa.

Early life
Fischer was born on 9 April 1850 in Green Point, Cape Town in to Johannes Jacobus George Fischer, formerly of the Dutch East India Company, and Catherina Anna Margertha Brink.

Biography
He was educated at the South African College, and became a lawyer in Cape Colony, joining the bar in 1875. In 1873 he married Ana Robertson (1851-1927), the daughter of Scottish immigrants to the Free State. He became interested in the politics of the Orange Free State, and in 1878 became a member of the Orange Free State's Volksraad. He became vice-president of the Volksraad in 1893, a member of the executive council in 1896, and took part in many colonial and interstate conferences. He headed a joint deputation from Transvaal and Orange Free State to Europe and America during the Boer War to solicit support for the Boers, returning in 1903 to practice law in the newly formed Orange River Colony.

Continuing to promote the Boer cause, he helped form the Orangia Unie party in May 1906 and became its chairman; the party won the majority of seats in the colony's first elections that were held in November 1907. On 27 November, he was chosen as Prime Minister, and stayed in that position until it ceased to exist with the union of 31 May 1910. He then joined the cabinet of the Union of South Africa as Minister of Lands. He was made Privy Councillor in 1911 and became Minister of the Interior and Lands in 1912.

He was the father of Percy Fischer, a Judge President of the Orange Free State. He was the grandfather of Bram Fischer, a noted anti-apartheid activist.

References

1850 births
1913 deaths
Afrikaner people
Members of the House of Assembly (South Africa)
South African Party (Union of South Africa) politicians
Ministers of Home Affairs of South Africa
South African members of the Privy Council of the United Kingdom
Alumni of South African College Schools